Wiktor Grotowicz (23 October 1919 – 19 December 1985) was a Polish actor. He appeared in more than 45 films and television shows between 1954 and 1985.

Selected filmography
 Katastrofa (1965)
 Colonel Wolodyjowski (1969)
 Fever (1981)
 Dreszcze (1981)

References

External links

1919 births
1985 deaths
Polish male film actors
People from Białystok